Eran Egozy is  an Israeli chief technical officer and VP of engineering of Harmonix Music Systems, a company he founded with Alex Rigopulos in 1995. He also works as professor of the practice at MIT.

Biography
Egozy is a native of Israel. He moved to Lexington, Massachusetts, at the age of 12. When he was 15, his parents bought him an Apple II computer, which he programmed to play Beethoven's Ninth Symphony. He earned a Bachelor of Science and Master of Science degrees in electrical engineering and computer science from MIT in 1995, where he worked with renowned electronic music composer Tod Machover at the MIT Media Laboratory. During his stay at MIT, he met then future co-founder of Harmonix, Alex Rigopulos, at the MIT Media Lab.

Career

Harmonix
Immediately after graduating, he co-founded Cambridge, Massachusetts, based Harmonix Music Systems with fellow MIT alumnus Alex Rigopulos. Harmonix is an interactive computer music company specializing in the development of real-time music generating computer programs for the entertainment industry. Currently, Egozy is the chief technical officer at Harmonix.  Egozy and Rigopulos were listed in Time magazine's 2008 list of the 100 most influential people for their work on Rock Band.

Music 
Egozy studied clarinet at the New England Conservatory of Music. He has performed with symphonies in the greater Boston area, including the Boston Youth Symphony Orchestras, the MIT Symphony Orchestra, MIT's Chamber Music Society, MIT's Gamelan Galak Tika, and the Newton Symphony Orchestra. While at MIT, he performed several solo recitals. He also performed the Nielsen Clarinet Concerto with the MIT Symphony. Egozy has played with the MIT Chamber Music Society for seven years, and was a founding member of the now-defunct Aurelius Ensemble. He is also credited as a long-time participant in the Apple Hill Chamber Music festival. Egozy is clarinetist for the critically acclaimed Radius Ensemble, based in Cambridge, Massachusetts.

Games credited

References

External links

Year of birth missing (living people)
Living people
American chief technology officers
Israeli emigrants to the United States
Israeli Jews
Video game developers
Game Developers Conference Pioneer Award recipients